The 2007 Sam Houston State Bearkats football team represented Sam Houston State University as a member of the Southland Conference during the 2007 NCAA Division I FCS football season. Led by third-year head coach Todd Whitten, the Bearkats compiled an overall record of 7–4 with a mark of 5–2 in conference play, and finished tied for second in the Southland.

Schedule

References

Sam Houston State
Sam Houston Bearkats football seasons
Sam Houston State Bearkats football